Daniel P. Kristiansen (born December 13, 1962) is a former American politician of the Republican Party. He was a member of the Washington House of Representatives, representing the 39th district, and the former House Minority Leader.

Controversy 

In 2010, Washington State officials received a formal complaint regarding Representative Kristiansen's campaign finances.  According to state law, contributions from a single business were legally capped at $1600 per election.  The Rairdon Auto Group, however, contributed four times that amount.  This was accomplished by writing 4 separate checks for $1600, with each originating from 4 different Rairdon dealership locations.  The dealerships shared ownership and board members, and the donations bore identical dates.  During Representative Kristiansen's 2010 campaign for the legislature, the independence of the dealerships was called into question, as well as the legality of using multiple business locations to circumvent campaign contribution limits.

In 2009, shortly before receiving campaign contributions from the Rairdon Auto Group, Representative Kristiansen cosponsored HB 2182.  The purpose of HB 2182 was to reduce business and operations taxes for automotive dealers and automotive service providers.  Legislative documents describe HB 2182 as "AN ACT Relating to reducing the business and occupation tax rate for retailers, wholesalers, and service providers of motor vehicles" and an amendment of RCW 82.04.860.

On February 20, 2018, while arguing against new gun regulations in the State Legislature during a regularly scheduled news conference in the state capital, Olympia, Kristiansen told the media that "More people are actually killed by knives than by guns." This comment was in response to a mass shooting that happened just a week earlier in Parkland, Florida, where 17 people were killed.

Kristiansen then told a fictitious story about a knife attack in Norway that he claimed took the lives of two dozen children at a youth camp, pressing the point that knives were more dangerous than guns, and as such, no new gun ban legislation should be brought forth. As it turns out, the story told by Rep. Kristiansen was not true and never actually happened. The falsification of the story was confirmed by Norwegian Criminology Professor Hedi Lomell at the University of Oslo and by Jon-Åge Øyslebø, the press attaché at the Norwegian Embassy in Washington, D.C.

In 2016, according to an annual report by the Washington Association of Sheriffs and Police Chiefs, Washington State experienced 18 homicides by knife compared to 95 homicides by firearms.

In 2016, Dan Kristiansen received $1,950 from the NRA during WA House Dist. 39, Snohomish race.

Retirement from office 
On March 6, 2018, two weeks after the "...more people are killed by knives than guns" story he told of Norway, Dan Kristiansen announced he will not seek re-election in November. The 39th District representative has stepped down from his role, but will complete his term.

Awards 
 2014 Guardians of Small Business award. Presented by NFIB.

References

1962 births
21st-century American politicians
Living people
Republican Party members of the Washington House of Representatives
People from Snohomish County, Washington